Chen Xia  (born 26 November 1969) is a Chinese footballer who played as a defender for the China women's national football team. She was part of the team at the 1991 FIFA Women's World Cup. At the club level, she played for the team "Guangdong" in China.

References

External links
 

1969 births
Living people
Chinese women's footballers
China women's international footballers
Place of birth missing (living people)
1991 FIFA Women's World Cup players
Women's association football defenders
Footballers at the 1990 Asian Games
Asian Games medalists in football
Asian Games gold medalists for China
Medalists at the 1990 Asian Games
20th-century Chinese women